The Woman I Love is a 1929 American silent drama film directed by George Melford and starring Margaret Morris, Robert Frazer and Leota Lorraine.

Cast 
 Margaret Morris as Edna Reed 
 Robert Frazer as John Reed 
 Leota Lorraine as Lois Parker 
 Norman Kerry as Kenneth Hamilton 
 Bert Moorhouse as Lois' Boyfriend

References

Bibliography
 George A. Katchmer. Eighty Silent Film Stars: Biographies and Filmographies of the Obscure to the Well Known. McFarland, 1991.

External links

1929 films
Films directed by George Melford
American silent feature films
1920s English-language films
American black-and-white films
Silent American drama films
1929 drama films
Film Booking Offices of America films
1920s American films